Mohammad-Ali Ramin (born 1954) is an Iranian politician, political analyst and writer who served as the Vice Minister of Culture and a presidential advisor under President Mahmoud Ahmadinejad. He organised the International Conference to Review the Global Vision of the Holocaust, a conference involving Holocaust deniers, which took place in Tehran in 2006.

Early life and education
Mohammad-Ali Ramin was born in 1954, in Dezful, Khuzestan Province. 

He attended Clausthal University of Technology and Karlsruhe Institute of Technology in Germany, studying Mechanical Engineering and Process Engineering. Ramin lived in Germany from 1971 to 1994, until he was deported, allegedly for links with the far-right National Democratic Party of Germany. He speaks fluent German. He founded the Islamische Gemeinschaft in Clausthal.

Ramin heads the Society for the Defence of Muslims in the West and the founder of a group called The Cells of the Martyrs of the Velayat (velayat: the conversion of the dogma within Shia Islam).

Career

Deputy Culture minister
In November 2009, the Minister for Culture Mohammad Hosseini appointed Ramin as his Deputy Culture Minister. He continued this position until December 2010.

Sanctions were placed on Ramin on 23 May 2012 by the European Union for 'abuse of human rights'. The EU identified Ramin as having been complicit in censorship activities while he was in government.

Views on the Holocaust

in December 2006, Ramin organised the International Conference to Review the Global Vision of the Holocaust which took place in Tehran. Prominent attendees included far right political activist David Duke, revisionist historical scholar Robert Faurisson and Haredi Rabbi and anti-Zionist activist Yisroel Dovid Weiss among others. Ramin personally invited German psychologist Bendikt Frings, a member of the far-right National Democratic Party of Germany. The conference provoked international criticism.

According to Aftab News, Ramin was the one who initiated the idea of "relocation of Israel" and also the idea that the "Holocaust is a myth". He himself accepted the full responsibility of this action, as Aftab News reported. In an interview with Financial Times, Ramin stated that he has also initiated the "Holocaust commission" and he is the founder of the Conference on Holocaust in Tehran.

Ramin suggested that former Iranian president Mahmoud Ahmadinejad establish a committee for clarifying the "real extent" of the Holocaust.

Ramin praised Ahmadinejad for having voiced his doubts over the Holocaust and the need for relocating the Jews to Europe if Europeans really did the massacre during the Second World War.

Following his ideas and suggestions about the Holocaust, President Ahmadinejad appointed him as an advisor.

Quotes:
On Jews: "Historically, there are many accusations against the Jews. For example, it was said that they were the source for such deadly diseases as the plague and typhus. This is because the Jews are very filthy people. For a time people also said that they poisoned water wells belonging to Christians and thus killed them".
On Israel: "By taking the Jews to the Muslim world, they (the West) have created a situation where the Jews will be destroyed. And so you can see that Israel has been created to destroy not only Muslims but the Jews themselves."
On the West: "When the Islamic Revolution of Iran succeeded and attracted many people around the world, including Christians, the AIDS epidemic came about, and fear again overtook the world. After the September 11 attacks, the deadly epidemic broke out, which was destroyed when the U.S. invaded Afghanistan. On the eve of the invasion of Iran, the SARS (Severe Acute Respiratory Syndrome) illness broke out, but disappeared after the invasion".
On 9/11 attacks: "The Zionists have blamed it on the Muslims so that they have an excuse to attack some Muslim nations, but it was all for naught. The Jews had also helped Nero, and it had not saved the Roman Empire from collapse."

Personal life
Ramin is married to Dr. Susan Safaverdi. Together they have two sons and one daughter, Mohammad Yasin Ramin (born 1981), Mohammad Amin Ramin (born 1987), and Salehe Ramin (born 1989). He is the father-in-law of Iranian actress Mahnaz Afshar.

He teaches at Payame Noor University in Tehran.

See also
 Mahmoud Ahmadinejad and Israel
 International Holocaust Cartoon Competition
 Nasser Pourpirar
 Historical Revisionism

References

External links
 Mohammad-Ali Ramin's weblog
 An interview with Mohammad-Ali Ramin (Baztab news 2006)
 

1954 births
Iranian Holocaust deniers
Living people
German people of Iranian descent
People from Khuzestan Province
Coalition of the Pleasant Scent of Servitude politicians
Association of Muslim Journalists politicians
Presidential advisers of Iran
Iranian Vice Ministers